This is a list of White Alice Communications System sites. The White Alice Communications System (WACS) was a United States Air Force telecommunication link system constructed in Alaska during the Cold War. It featured tropospheric scatter links and line-of-sight microwave radio links.

Original White Alice installations
These sites were part of the initial White Alice system and connected Aircraft Control and Warning (AC&W) sites with central command and control facilities. The Boswell Bay to Neklasson Lake link was both the first and last operational link in the White Alice system, serving from 1956 to 1985.

Tropospheric scatter sites

Microwave sites

Dual Tropo/Micro

Note: There were Tropo Billboards at Soldotna (co-located with the TD2) and at Fire Island, as well.
Also, There was a TD-2 site at what is now the Civil Air Patrol Wing Headquarters on Elmendorf AFB—it was called R2N.
And, there is a TD-2 site at Rabbit Creek, that was originally, and briefly, called R1S, which linked into the TD-2 site at Naptowne.
Est. indicates location unclear from USGS topo

The BMEWS Network
The second segment of White Alice was a pair of TD-2 microwave radio links that supported the Ballistic Missile Early Warning System (BMEWS) at Clear Air Force Station. This section provided two routes from Alaska to NORAD in Colorado, for this reason it was also known as the Rearward Communications System. The A Route went down the southeast coast of Alaska to a submarine cable and the B Route went east into Canada. Some of the systems were colocated with previous sites.

A Route
Aurora, Black Rapids, Boswell Bay, Cape Yakataga, Clear, Donnelly Dome, Duncan Canal, Glennallen, Harding Lake, Hoonah, McCallum, Murphy Dome, Neklasson Lake, Ocean Cape, Paxson, Pedro Dome, Sawmill, Sheep Mountain, Smuggler Cove, Tahneta Pass, Tolsona

B Route
Beaver Creek, Canyon Creek, Cathedral, Delta Junction, Gerstle River, Gold King Creek, Knob Ridge, Tok Junction

Project Stretchout sites
Project Stretchout began in 1959 and finished in the mid-1960s. It was the extension of White Alice to the Alaska Peninsula including the Aleutian DEW Line system.

Project Bluegrass sites
Extension of the White Alice system from Nikolski to Shemya near the end of the Aleutian Islands. Both sites were demolished before 1987. In addition to the Aleutian Island extension, Project Bluegrass also included a 50 kW shot from Fort Yukon to Barter Island to connect the northern DEW line to the White Alice system.

See also

 Radio propagation

References

Communications in Alaska
History of telecommunications in the United States
White Alice
Military installations in Alaska
Political history of Alaska
Telecommunications lists
Telecommunications equipment of the Cold War